Saint-Damien (formerly named Saint-Damien-de-Brandon) is a parish municipality of 2,393 inhabitants in Quebec, Canada. It is located in Matawinie Regional County Municipality in the Lanaudière region.

History
The town was founded the 6 September 1870. In French, people from the town are known as damiennois.

Geography 
The main street is named "Rue Principale" (meaning, literally, "main street") and it is served by Quebec Route 347 which runs from Quebec Route 158 at Sainte-Geneviève-de-Berthier (2 km west of exit 144 on Autoroute 40) through Saint-Gabriel-de-Brandon, Saint Damien, Sainte-Émélie-de-l'Énergie and Saint-Côme to Québec Route 125 in Notre-Dame-de-la-Merci.

The bordering municipalities  of Saint-Damien  are, starting from northwest and proceeding clockwise, Saint-Zénon (northwest), Mandeville (northeast, in D'Autray Regional County Municipality), Saint-Gabriel-de-Brandon (southeast, in D'Autray Regional County Municipality), Saint-Jean-de-Matha (south) and Sainte-Émélie-de-l'Énergie (west).

Demographics 

{|
|

Mother tongue:
 English as first language: 1.3%
 French as first language: 95.6%
 English and French as first language: 0.8%
 Other as first language: 1.7%

Education

The Commission scolaire des Samares operates francophone public schools, including:
 École Saint-Coeur-de-Marie

The Sir Wilfrid Laurier School Board operates anglophone public schools, including:
 Joliette Elementary School in Saint-Charles-Borromée
 Joliette High School in Joliette

Famous people 
 Marie Jean-Eudes (1897-1981), Canadian nun and botanist
 Raymond Gravel (b. 1952), Canadian politician

See also 
 List of parish municipalities in Quebec

References

External links 

  Saint-Damien official website
  Town flag and informations at FOTW

Parish municipalities in Quebec
Incorporated places in Lanaudière
Matawinie Regional County Municipality